Adán Noriega (born 30 September 1947) is a Mexican former field hockey player who competed in the 1968 Summer Olympics and in the 1972 Summer Olympics. He was born in Mexico City.

References

External links
 

1947 births
Living people
Mexican male field hockey players
Olympic field hockey players of Mexico
Field hockey players at the 1968 Summer Olympics
Field hockey players at the 1972 Summer Olympics
Pan American Games medalists in field hockey
Pan American Games silver medalists for Mexico
Sportspeople from Mexico City
Field hockey players at the 1971 Pan American Games
Medalists at the 1971 Pan American Games